The Gelasian Decree is a Latin text traditionally thought to be a Decretal of the prolific Pope Gelasius I, bishop of Rome from 492–496. The work reached its final form in a five-chapter text written by an anonymous scholar between 519 and 553, the second chapter of which is a list of books of Scripture presented as having been made part of the biblical canon by a Council of Rome under Pope Damasus I, the bishop of Rome from 366–383. This list is known as the Damasine List. The fifth chapter of the work includes a list of distrusted and rejected works not encouraged for church use.

Little is known of the compiler of the decree, other than perhaps he was of Southern Gallic (modern Southern France) origin.

Content
The Decretum exists in a number of recensions of varying lengths. The longest has 5 chapters, another recension has the last 4 of these chapters, another the last 3, and another the first 3.

Chapters
1. A list of the 7 gifts of the Holy Spirit as attributes of Christ, and of the titles that are applied to Christ

2. A list of the books that make up the Old and New Testament. The Old Testament list contains, in addition to the books of the Hebrew Bible, all of the deuterocanonical books other than Baruch with the Letter of Jeremiah. The New Testament list contains the 27 standard books: 4 Gospels, Acts, 14 letters of Paul (including Hebrews), Apocalyse of John, and 7 General Letters (of which 2 and 3 John are attributed to "the other John the elder", and Jude to "Judas the Zealot". The Decretum'''s canon of Scripture is identical with the "Catholic" canon issued by the Council of Trent, except for the lack of Baruch with the Letter of Jeremiah.

3. a short endorsement of the supremacy of the Bishop of Rome over the other bishops, citing the authority of Peter, and a statement of the order of precedence of the 3 principal episcopal sees: Rome, then Alexandria, then Antioch.

4. a list of writings that are “to be received”: the decrees of the first 4 ecumenical councils, and the writings of the Church Fathers and ecclesiastical writers mentioned in the chapter,  varying from famous to obscure (for example Sedulius and Juvencus). Notably, it suggests that while Origen of Alexandria's work can be read, he personally should be rejected as a "schismatic".

5. a list of writings that are “not to be received”: many early Christian gospels, acts, apocalypses and similar works that are part of what we know as the New Testament Apocrypha. Mentioned are: 
 The Acts of Andrew, of Thomas, of Peter, of Philip, and of Paul and Thecla.
 The Gospels of Matthias, of James, of Peter, of Thomas, of Bartholomew, of  Andrew, the Syriac Infancy Gospel and the  Gospel of Barnabas.
 The Apocalypses of Paul, Thomas, and of Stephen. 
 The Testament of Job, the Apocryphon of Jannes and Jambres, the Lots of the Apostles and the Letters from Jesus to Abgar and from Abgar to Jesus.

Attribution
The various recensions of the Decretum appear in multiple surviving manuscripts. It is “attributed in many manuscripts to Pope Damasus (366-84). In other and more numerous manuscripts the same decree occurs in an enlarged form assigned within the documents in some cases to Pope Gelasius (492-6), in others to Pope Hormisdas (514-23), and in a few cases the documents are simply anonymous.”

The Damasine recension

 

In the Damasine recension, there is no mention of pope Gelasius.
Though the date of the Roman Council is not mentioned in the Decretum, the view that came to prevail was that it was the council held in 382: “In 1794 F. Arevalo, the editor of Sedulius, started the theory that the first three of these five chapters were really the decrees of a Roman Council held a century earlier than Gelasius, under Damasus, in 382 A.D.”.

The Gelasian recension

Another recension contains only the last 3 chapters and is prefaced by the sentence: “Here begins the decretal 'On books to be received and not to be received' which was written by Pope Gelasius and seventy most erudite bishops at the apostolic seat in the city of Rome”. Here the focus is on the books and the Decretum is considered to be a decretal of pope Gelasius. In the Gelasian recension there is no mention of pope Damasus and the Council of Rome.

Traditional View
For years, the commonly accepted view was that the Decretum Gelasianum was a decretal of pope Gelasius, containing the text of a canon of Scripture originally produced by the Council of Rome under Damasus a century earlier, and that this canon was identical with the “Catholic canon” issued by the Council of Trent.

For instance, the Oxford Dictionary of the Christian Church, states:

Likewise, Catholic apologist and historian William Jurgens writes:

Some Catholic authors claim the Council of Rome of 382 closed the canon, and so the Christian Church's canon of Scripture is the "Catholic canon", defined in 382 and later repeated at Trent. Thus, the Catholic Encyclopedia:

 

And Catholic Answers, which claims to be “the world’s largest source of explanations for Catholic beliefs and practices”, says: 

Modern View
Modern scholars are generally in agreement that the Decretum is not a papal document at all but the work of an anonymous writer:

von Dobschütz

Likewise, the Oxford Dictionary of the Christian Church says:

The work by von Dobschütz referred to above is a 1912 examination of all the manuscripts of the Decretum. As explained by Burkitt in his review of the work, von Dobschütz showed that:
 all of the versions are derived from the five-chapter recension, which is therefore the earliest one.
 the first chapter of the five-chapter recension contains a quotation from a work of Augustine written some 35 years after the Council of Rome of 382, and therefore the Damasine recension of the Decretum could not be a decree of that Council: “... there is a quotation of some length from Augustine in Joh. ix 7 (Migne, xxxv 146l). As Augustine was writing about 416, it is evident that the Title Incipit Concilium Vrbis Romae sub Damaso Papa de Explanatione Fidei is of no historical value.”
 nor can the Gelasian recension be a decretal of Gelasius, since it is never mentioned in later collections of decretals.
 therefore, the Decretum is “no genuine decree or letter either of Damasus or Gelasius, but a pseudonymous literary production of the first half of the sixth century (between 519 and 553)”.

Hahnemann

In the course of examining the place of the Muratorian fragment in the development of the canon, Geoffrey Mark Hahnemann examined the Decretum Gelasianum and came to a similar conclusion.

First argument: Jerome is silent about the issuing of a canonical list by the council of Rome in 382. “It seems highly improbable that, if Jerome, who was probably present at the council and was certainly at Rome, had ever heard of such a pronouncement about canonical books, he should nowhere have mentioned it, or that it should not have qualified his own statements on the Canon. [...]  Yet there is no mention or evidence of a change of position in the works of Jerome. The authenticity of at least the catalogue in the Damasine Decree is thus called into question.”

Second argument: the Decretum is never mentioned in the first centuries following the Council of Rome of 382. 
 The Damasine Decree is not mentioned in any independent document before 840, some three and a half centuries after the holding of the council that is supposed to have issued it.
 Nor is it mentioned by any ecclesiastical historian of those centuries.
 When discussing the canon, pope Nicholas I in the ninth century mentions the letter of Innocent I (401-17) but not any decree of Damasus, which, being earlier, would be more important.
 The later writers of the 9th century who refer to the document under the name of Gelasius or Hormisdas never refer to the decree of Damasus upon which it supposedly rests.
 The earliest collection of Latin canons and decretals, that of Dionysius Exiguus, begins with Damasus' successor, Siricius, an obscure pope, thus implying that no pope before Siricius issued decretals.

Hahnemann's conclusion: Both the Damasine and the Gelasian versions of the text “were written after the time of Gelasius, and only later attributed to these early bishops of Rome.”

Textual history
The complete text is preserved in the mid-eighth-century Ragyndrudis Codex, fols. 57r-61v, which is the earliest manuscript copy containing the complete text. The earliest manuscript copy was produced c. 700, Brussels 9850-2.

Versions of the work appear in multiple surviving manuscripts, some of which are titled as a Decretal of Pope Gelasius, others as a work of a Roman Council under the earlier Pope Damasus. However, all versions show signs of being derived from the full five-part text, which contains a quotation from Augustine, writing about 416 after Damasus, which is evidence for the document being later than that.

References

External links
The Development of the Canon": Decretum Gelasianum gives the full list, including the apocrypha "which are to be avoided by Catholics."
Decretum Gelasianum: at The Latin Library.
Decretum Gelasianum: in English.
 Review of Ernst von Dobschütz, Das Decretum Gelasianum de libris recipiendis et non recipiendis in kritischem Text Leipzig, 1912: F. C. Burkitt in Journal of Theological Studies'' 14 (1913) pp. 469–471.

Works by the Church Fathers
New Testament apocrypha
6th-century Christian texts
Development of the Christian biblical canon